Sérgio Simões de Jesus (born 20 May 1980), commonly known as Serginho, is a Brazilian football coach and former player who played as a defensive midfielder. He is the current assistant manager of Água Santa.

External links

1980 births
Living people
Brazilian footballers
Association football midfielders
Campeonato Brasileiro Série A players
Campeonato Brasileiro Série B players
Grêmio Esportivo Sãocarlense players
Esporte Clube Internacional players
Mixto Esporte Clube players
Clube Atlético Juventus players
Guarani FC players
Rio Branco Esporte Clube players
Paraná Clube players
São Bernardo Futebol Clube players
Comercial Futebol Clube (Ribeirão Preto) players
Atlético Monte Azul players
Clube Atlético Sorocaba players
Rio Branco Football Club players
Ypiranga Futebol Clube players
Associação Atlética Aparecidense players
Esporte Clube Taubaté players
Esporte Clube Água Santa players
Cuiabá Esporte Clube players
Brazilian football managers
Esporte Clube Água Santa managers